Alexander Gadegaard Shah (also known as Alex Shah born: 29 October 2002) is a Nepalese professional swimmer. He represented Nepal in 2020 Tokyo Olympics in the 100 meter freestyle. Shah was selected to the Olympics as a wild card qualifier. His father is Nepalese & mother is Danish.

Participation
 World Championships 2019 in 50 m and 100 m freestyle at Gwangju, Korea
 World Junior Championships in 2017 in 50 m and 100 m freestyle at Indianapolis, US

References

External links
 

1995 births
 Living people
Swimmers from Copenhagen
 Olympic swimmers of Nepal
 Nepalese male swimmers
 Swimmers at the 2012 Summer Olympics
Swimmers at the 2020 Summer Olympics
Sportspeople from Kathmandu
21st-century Nepalese people